CRPF Public School in Prashant Vihar, Rohini is a recognized co-educational school affiliated to the Central Board of Secondary Education. It follows the Continuous and Comprehensive Evaluation pattern of education and offers education from grade levels Kindergarten to 12th Grade. The students in the school are divided into four houses namely, Shakti, Shaurya, Shradhha and Shram. The principal of the school is Mrs. Nidhi Chaudhary.

History 
The school was started in 1988 to provide more affordable education to children belonging to families of Central Reserve Police Force personnel. The first principal of The school was Mr. Suraj Prakash.

Alumni 
The CRPF Public School cannot lay claim to many notable alumni, except for a few footballers who have graduated from the institution including Munmum Lugun, Rohit Kumar, Gaurav Bora, Anirudh Sharma-2004 batch (founder of Lechal and Graviky Labs), Nikhil Kaushik (co-founder Graviky Labs)- 2004 batch, Kshitij Gujral (fashion photographer who was also featured on MTV and ibibo) - 2004 batch, Asit tripathy (bollywood playback singer)- 2004 batch and Shashank Jha (Casting Director)- 2004 batch

See also
Education in India
List of schools in India
List of schools in Delhi affiliated with CBSE

References

External links 
http://www.crpfpsrohini.org/Faculty
 Central Board of Secondary Education

Schools in Delhi
Educational institutions established in 1988
1988 establishments in Delhi